As of February 2021, NordStar operates to the following destinations:

References

NordStar